V. T. Dehejia was an Indian career civil servant and bank executive. He is most notable for having served as the fifth Chairman of State Bank of India.

Career

Early career 

He was one of the early recipients of the Jamsetjee Nusserwanjee Tata Scholarship established in 1892. He was known for being an outstanding scholar in his school days and achieved many laurels.

Civil Service 

He joined the Imperial Civil Service before India's independence in 1947.

He was the district collector of Ahmednagar district in Maharashtra from 27 April 1935 to 07 December 1935.

He has also served in the post of secretary to the Ministry of Finance (India).

Banking career 

He served as the fifth Chairman of State Bank of India from March 1965 until February 1969.

After his retirement in 1990, he was succeeded by Raj Kumar Talwar as the Chairman of State Bank of India. Raj Kumar Talwar went on to have one of the longest tenures of any Chairman of the State Bank of India 

During his tenure, The National Credit Council (NCC) was established in October 1968, to estimate the credit requirements in Indian trade and industry. The committee came to be known as the Dehejia Committee and made several important recommendations on working capital estimation.

Legacy 

V. T. Dehejia is notable for being one of the last members of the Imperial Civil Service to serve as Chairman of State Bank of India. After him, all the future Chairmen of State Bank of India were either career bankers or were sourced from the Indian Administrative Service.

References

External Links 

 SBI chairmen
 SBI history
 Biography at the Reserve Bank of India
 Dehejia Committee

Indian civil servants
Indian bankers
Central bankers
State Bank of India
Reserve Bank of India
Chairmen of the State Bank of India
Indian corporate directors